Edmund Rowlatt (1633–1693) was an Anglican priest in the second half of the seventeenth century. 

Rowlatt was born in Loddington, Northamptonshire and educated at Pembroke College, Cambridge. He was Archdeacon of Achonry from 1668 to1693.

References 

Irish Anglicans
Archdeacons of Achonry
17th-century English Anglican priests
Alumni of Pembroke College, Cambridge
People from Northamptonshire
1633 births
1693 deaths